Burdur District (also: Merkez, meaning "central") is a district of the Burdur Province of Turkey. Its seat is the city of Burdur. Its area is 1,567 km2, and its population is 117,189 (2021).

Composition
There is one municipality in Burdur District:
 Burdur

There are 51 villages in Burdur District:

 Aksu
 Akyaka
 Akyayla
 Askeriye
 Aşağımüslümler
 Aziziye
 Başmakçı
 Bayındır
 Bereket
 Beşkavak
 Boğaziçi
 Bozlar
 Büğdüz 
 Çallıca
 Çatağıl
 Çendik
 Cimbilli
 Çine
 Düğer
 Erikli
 Gökçebağ
 Günalan
 Güneyyayla
 Hacılar
 Halıcılar
 İğdeli
 İlyas
 Kapaklı
 Karacaören
 Karaçal
 Karakent
 Kartalpınar
 Kavacık
 Kayaaltı
 Kayış
 Kocapınar
 Kökez
 Kozluca
 Kumluca
 Kurna
 Kuruçay
 Sarıova
 Soğanlı
 Suludere
 Taşkapı
 Ulupınar
 Yarıköy
 Yassıgüme
 Yaylabeli
 Yazıköy
 Yeşildağ

References

Districts of Burdur Province